is a Japanese footballer who currently plays for SC Sagamihara

Career statistics

Club

Notes

References

1999 births
Living people
Japanese footballers
Japanese expatriate footballers
Association football midfielders
Singapore Premier League players
UE Cornellà players
SC Sagamihara players
Albirex Niigata Singapore FC players
Japanese expatriate sportspeople in Spain
Expatriate footballers in Spain
Japanese expatriate sportspeople in Singapore
Expatriate footballers in Singapore